Balūchī (also Romanized as Baluchi, and Balūči) is a town in Helmand Province, Afghanistan.

See also
 Helmand Province

References

Populated places in Helmand Province